is a puzzle video game developed by Sonic Team and published by Sega for the Nintendo 3DS, to celebrate the 25th anniversary of the Puyo Puyo series. It is the first release featuring 3D models for characters instead of the traditional 2D.

In addition of the traditional mechanics, it introduces role-playing elements, allowing to have up to three allies in team, as well as over 60 side missions and introduces a new protagonist, Ally.

Modes 
Puyo Puyo Chronicle offers a series of mechanics and modes present in previous releases, as well as a story mode in RPG format.

RPG mode 
The main mode. Starring Arle Nadja, who was attracted by a mysterious glow from a book, being moved to another world. Arle will meet Ally, who will accompany her on her adventure for that new world.

The story mode has a number of features:

Quest 
In "RPG mode", the game progresses basically by achieving "missions" that occur in various places. The search has a "main search" related to the progress of the story and a "sub-search" not related to the progress of the main story, and a reward can be obtained when the search is accomplished.

Skill Battle 
The "Skill Battle" begins when you touch a monster in the field. In this mode, if you erase Puyos, you can drop nuisance Puyos on your opponent and attack. During the battle, the monsters can send nuisance Puyos to the opponent, and if they fall to the playing field, the character's HP will decrease. In addition, when the Puyos accumulate to the top of the board, the remaining HP are considerably reduced and the field restarts. Nuisance Puyos will not fall during the offset. If you win in battle, you can earn coins and improve the character card. In addition, the seeds of the chain appear in their field at the beginning of the battle, the HP/MP will always recover fully after the battle is over. Touching a monster from behind in the field increases the "chain seed" that appears at the beginning of the battle on a chain. On the other hand, if the monster is touched from behind, it will be "unexpected" and nuisance Puyo will fall to the enemy's board and take damage.

Skills 
Each character has a different "skill", and can be activated at will by consuming MP while playing. The skills have a variety of effects, such as changing the color of the puyos on the board and increasing the powers of the character.

Team 
In skill battles, a team is formed organizing up to 3 characters and up to 4 "Puyo Puyo Cards". The HP and MP status of the team changes according to the character and organization of the cards. When a character advances through the story or wins a battle, the character joins the group and can be added to the player's team. Also, if you defeat a monster along the way, you can join a group. In addition, the battles of "Skill Battle" of "Minna de Puyo Puyo" and "Internet" are carried out using the team data created in the "RPG mode".

Character and item cards 
Characters can be strengthened by equipping with Puyo Puyo cards that can be obtained from village stores and treasure chests in the countryside. There are several types of Puyo Puyo cards that can be combined to create stronger cards.

Boss battle with everyone 
There is a "Boss battle with everyone" mode for 2-4 players who collaborate with other players in local communications to defeat the boss. In this mode, you can challenge the use of your saved data, and you can get a rare "Puyo Puyo Card" by defeating the boss. The rules of the battle are the same as for the previous "Battle of Skills", but in this mode, when the "Condition of Opportunity Time" shown at the beginning of the battle is reached, "Time of Opportunity" (same that "Fever Mode" of "Puyo Puyo Fever") Occurs for a certain time.

Single player 
Single-player mode through the different rules and modes available.

Local multiplayer 
A mode for battles between two or four players in the local network.

Online multiplayer 
Mode for two or four players online in three different rules: Skill Battle, Puyo Puyo Dori and Puyo Puyo Fever. You can participate in the following modes:

 "National Puzzle League", where you can play one on one, advancing in the ranking
 "Club", where you can play between two or four players with custom rules.

Lessons 
A way in which the player can learn the basic rules and chain techniques of Puyo Puyo.

Data 
There are "stores" where you can see the results of each mode, change the options and buy several items (hidden items) using points to play.

Rules 
The game has several rules available, most of them previous releases, among some:

 Puyo Puyo, with the classic Puyo Puyo rules (limit is the last row of the third column, without offset).
 Puyo Puyo Tsu, with the rules of the aforementioned game (the same rules as the first game, with the addition of offset)
 Puyo Puyo SUN, with the SUN rules (with the introduction of the SUN Puyos, which award a large number of points when erasing adjacent Puyos)
 Puyo Puyo Fever, with the rules introduced in that release (limit is the third and fourth column, and Fever mode)
 Nazo Puyo, with various puzzle challenges with pre-set pieces
 Big Puyo Rush, in which the panel is reduced to 6x3, and when connecting 3 or more Puyos, they disappear.
 Chibi Puyo, in which the panel is increased to 10x18, and the goal is to reach a star buried between solid garbage Puyos; when erased, it will send infinite nuisance Puyos to the opponent

See also 

 Puyo Puyo Quest, Puyo Puyo mobile game on which some features of this game are based.

References

External links 

 Official website at Sega
Official site at Nintendo

2016 video games
Puyo Puyo
Japan-exclusive video games
Sega arcade games
Sega video games
Sonic Team games
Nintendo 3DS games
Nintendo 3DS-only games
Video games developed in Japan
Multiplayer and single-player video games